James Lindsay-Fynn (born 29 September 1975 in Dublin) is a British rower.

References 
 
 

1975 births
Living people
British male rowers
Sportspeople from Dublin (city)
Olympic rowers of Great Britain
Rowers at the 2008 Summer Olympics
World Rowing Championships medalists for Great Britain